Yazdanabad Rural District is a rural district (dehestan) in Yazdanabad District, Zarand County, Kerman Province, Iran. At the 2006 census, its population was 6,107, in 1,467 families. The rural district has 13 villages.

References 

Rural Districts of Kerman Province
Zarand County